Samsung Experience (stylized as SΛMSUNG Experience) was a software overlay for the Android "launcher" by Samsung for its Galaxy devices running Android 7.x “Nougat” and Android 8.x “Oreo”. It was introduced in late 2016 on a beta build based on Android 7.0 “Nougat” for the Galaxy S7, succeeding TouchWiz. It has been succeeded in 2018 by One UI based on Android 9 “Pie” and later versions.

History 

TouchWiz was the former name Samsung used for its UI and icons. It was originally released on May, 2008 for the SGH-F480 smartphone. Reviewers had criticized Samsung for including too many features and bloat, especially in the Galaxy S4, which included what many users called a Samsung "feature creep". In the following years, though, Samsung had incrementally removed the bloatware and extra features, until TouchWiz was no longer recognized as TouchWiz, leading them to rename it.

Features

Home screen 
Samsung Experience makes several changes to Android's default homescreen. The apps icon is on the bottom right of the screen instead of the bottom middle, the Google Now search bar is just below the middle of the screen instead of at the top, and there is a weather widget (provided by The Weather Channel or AccuWeather in select countries or devices) at the top right corner of the screen. In addition, a user can edit the apps grid layout.

Edge UX 
The "Edge" (curved glass at the edge of the screen) was originally introduced in the Galaxy Note Edge, and popularized with the Galaxy S6 Edge.

Edges 
The tasks edge gives users a shortcut to commonly utilized tasks, such as making a phone call to a certain contact, setting a timer, and creating an event in S Planner. It is an assortment of icons (e.g. contact pictures [with phone, messaging, or mail icons], an app icon with a plus symbol on its bottom right corner, or a photo [from your library] masked in the shape of a circle [with the gallery icon on the bottom right corner]) on the right of the screen. The people edge allows the user to add 5 different contacts to display on the screen, for quick access to functions such as calling, texting, and emailing. It displays the contact's name and photo. The apps edge displays ten of a user's most frequently used apps, with five in two columns. A user can also add a complete folder to the screen.

Edge panels 
Yahoo! sports, finance, and news are panels that are included with the phone. A user can download extra panels for ease of use, such as an RSS reader, Twitter trends, and news from CNN.

Quick tools 
With quick tools, the Edge transforms into a ruler, compass, or flashlight.

Edge feeds 
When a user swipes the edge of the screen and the screen is off, the edge display turns on and displays missed calls, the current time, weather, and news.

Grace UX 
First released with the Samsung Galaxy Note 7 for Android Marshmallow, the Grace UX was named after the device's codename, and eventually made its way to older devices, including the Galaxy Note 5 through an update (Korea and eventually to other countries), and the Galaxy S7 and S7 Edge through the official Android Nougat update. The Grace UX features a cleaner, flatter look to iconography and extensive use of white space. TouchWiz Grace UX devices also benefit from the Secure Folder functionality, which enables users to keep certain data, and even apps, behind a secure password.

In addition, for most countries, all the languages that were absent from previous versions (Android Marshmallow or earlier) will be available in this release, starting with the Galaxy Tab S3.

Always-on display 

Most of Samsung's mobile devices have AMOLED displays and the screen is left mostly black when the always-on display is active; only illuminated pixels require power since they are LEDs. The screen will display the current time, the calendar, or a selected image. There are different styles for each option (the clock has 7 styles, the calendar has 2 styles, and the image has 3 styles). Later on, additional functionality was added to turn on the always-on display feature either in a scheduled manner, or keep it always on. The always-on display also adjusts its brightness as per the ambient light brightness automatically.

The Always-on Display is available on Galaxy A series (2017 & 2018), Galaxy S7/S7 edge, Galaxy S8/S8+, Galaxy S9/S9+, Galaxy J7 (2017)/J7 Pro/J7+ (or C7 2017), Galaxy C5/C7/C9 Pro and Galaxy Note 7/FE/8/9 devices only.

File Manager 
Samsung includes a file manager with its Galaxy phones, unlike stock Android.

Game Launcher 
Any game that a user downloads is combined into a single folder. In that folder, one can optimize frame rate and resolution. It includes Game Tools, a button that appears when a user is playing a game. When tapped, it can mute notifications, turn off the capacitive keys, minimize the game, screenshot, and record gameplay.

Bixby 
Bixby is an assistant that launched with the Samsung Galaxy S8. It replaces S Voice on Samsung phones and has three parts, including Bixby Voice, Bixby Vision and Bixby Home. Bixby Voice can be triggered by saying "Hey Bixby" or pressing and holding the button located below the volume rocker, dubbed the Bixby Button. Bixby Vision is built into the camera app and can "see" what one can see as it is essentially an augmented reality camera that can identify objects in real time, search for them on various services, and offer the user to purchase them if available. Bixby is also able to translate text, read QR codes and recognize landmarks. Bixby Home can be found by swiping to the right on the home screen. It is a vertically scrolling list of information that Bixby can interact with, for example, weather, fitness activity, and buttons for controlling their smart home gadgets.

Keyword 

Bixby can do tasks related to a single keyword. For example, a simple "Good Night" can request the device to turn to silent mode and turn on the Night Mode display.

S Pen 
(exclusive to the Galaxy Note and Tab series)

 Air Command: A collection of shortcuts that appear when the S Pen is taken out.
 Smart Select: Create custom GIFs (also available on Galaxy S8/+ and S9/+ after 7.0 Nougat update)
 Samsung Notes: The user can take notes, draw, annotate, with a wide selection of brushes, pens, and colors (available as app on Galaxy Apps, except of S Pen writing, but still possible with finger or keyboard type)
 Live Message: The user can draw custom emojis, make animated GIFs, or write messages on photos (also available on Galaxy S8/S8+, S9/S9+ and Note FE after 7.0 Nougat update)
 Screen Off Memo: Capture notes when the screen is off.
 Glance: Have two apps open simultaneously and switch back and forth with ease.
 Magnify: Take a closer look whenever you need to.
 Translate: Translate words or sentences, and convert currencies and measurement units.
 Remote Control: Connected with Bluetooth, can trigger camera, navigate web browser, play/pause/fast forward in music apps. (exclusive to the Note 9)

Version history

Devices running Samsung Experience 
Note that this list is not exhaustive.

Smartphones

Tablets

References 

Android (operating system) software
Custom Android firmware
Mobile operating systems
Samsung software